The Journal of Business and Technical Communication is a quarterly peer-reviewed academic journal that focuses on communication best practices, problems, and trends in business and academic venues. The journal was established in 1987 and is published by SAGE Publishing. The editor-in-chief is Jo Mackiewicz (Iowa State University) Article types include research articles, commentaries, book and software reviews, and comments and responses.

Abstracting and indexing
The journal is abstracted and indexed in Scopus, EBSCO databases, ERIC, ProQuest databases, and the Social Sciences Citation Index. According to the Journal Citation Reports, its 2018 impact factor is 0.900, ranking it 77th out of 88 journals in the category "Communication" and 129th out of 147 journals in the category "Business".

References

External links
 

SAGE Publishing academic journals
Business and management journals
Quarterly journals
Publications established in 1987
English-language journals
Communication journals